The Ten Degree Channel is a channel that separates the Andaman Islands and Nicobar Islands from each other in the Bay of Bengal. The two sets of islands together form the Indian Union Territory (UT) of Andaman and Nicobar Islands. It has minimum depth of 7.3m and lies from east to west on the 10-degree line of latitude north of the equator, hence the name.

See also
 Andaman Sea
 Bay of Bengal
 Nine Degree Channel
 Coco Islands
 Preparis
 Exclusive economic zone of India

References

Channels of the Indian Ocean
Landforms of the Andaman and Nicobar Islands
Straits of India